Fire Squad is a 2008 Indonesian comedy drama film directed by Iqbal Rais, from a screenplay by Hilman Mutasi and story by Fajar Nugros. The film, staring Ringgo Agus Rahman, Deddy Mahendra Desta, Sukma Perdana Manaf and Judika, follows some students who works as a firefighter. It was released theatrically on September 26, 2008 and was nominated at the Indonesian Movie Awards with Judika winning Best New Actor.

Plot
Gito Prawoto, Dede Rifai, Kuncoro Prasetyo and Rojak Panggabean were threatened with drop outed from Merdeka University because they had not paid their tuition fees and their parents could afford to pay for college. The lecturers give dispensation but must pay at least one semester in a few days.

Each of them is looking for job, but they still need money for daily life. Until Kuncoro provided a solution to make it affordable and invited them to find a rented house near the campus and live a simple lifestyle. Gito got the idea to find a less tiring and time-consuming part-time job, a firefighter.

After attending the training, they are accepted as apprentices at the fire department as reserve officers with minimal equipment and are given the task of maintaining an old fire engine known as "Si Jago Merah". These happy students find their identity through a selfless heroic act that earns them an award from the mayor.

Cast

Accolades

References

External links
 
 

2008 films
Indonesian comedy-drama films
2008 comedy-drama films
2000s teen comedy films
Indonesian teen comedy films
Films set in Jakarta
Films shot in Indonesia
2000s Indonesian-language films
Films about firefighting
Films about the working class